The Romance of David Garrick is a 1942 historical play by the British writer Constance Cox.

It ran for 35 performances at St James's Theatre in London's West End. Donald Wolfit directed and starred as the eighteenth century actor David Garrick.

References

Bibliography
 Kabatchnik, Amnon. Blood on the Stage, 1950-1975: Milestone Plays of Crime, Mystery, and Detection. Scarecrow Press, 2011.
 Wearing, J.P. The London Stage 1940-1949: A Calendar of Productions, Performers, and Personnel.  Rowman & Littlefield, 2014.

1942 plays
Plays based on real people
Cultural depictions of British men
Cultural depictions of actors
West End plays
Plays set in the 18th century
Plays set in London
Plays by Constance Cox